Hope Ruhindi Mwesigye is a Ugandan lawyer and politician. She is the former Minister for Agriculture, Animal Industry & Fisheries from 16 February 2009 until 27 May 2011. Prior to that, she served as the State Minister for Local Government, from June 2006 until February 2011. In the cabinet reshuffle of 27 May 2011, she was dropped from the cabinet and replaced by Tress Bucyanayandi.

Early life and education
She was born on 28 December 1956, in Kabale District. She attended Kabale High School for her O-Level studies, And Trinity College Nabbingo for her A-Level education. Ms. Mwesigye went on to obtain a law degree (Bachelor of Law) with Honors, from Makerere University. She also holds the Diploma in Legal Practice, from the Law Development Center in Kampala. In addition, she attained the Master of Arts (MA) degree in Women and Gender Studies.

Work experience
Hope Mwesigye worked as a Senior State Attorney in the Ugandan Ministry of Justice for eight years prior to 1988. Between 1988 and 1991, she worked as the Program Officer at Uganda Gender Resources Center, a private non profit organization. Between 1991 and 2001, she served as the executive director of the same non-profit. She has also served as a Program Officer for FIDA (Uganda), another Ugandan non-profit specializing in championing the rights of women. In 2001, she entered elective politics and was elected to the parliamentary seat of Kabale District Women's Representative. She was re-elected in 2006 on the National Resistance Movement political party ticket. She lost her re-election bid in 2011 to Ronah Ninsiima', an Independent politician, who is the incumbent MP for Kabale Women's Representative. In the cabinet reshuffle of 27 May 2011, she was dropped from the cabinet.

Personal Details
She is reported to enjoy community mobilization drives for development. She is married and she is the mother of four children.

See also
 Cabinet of Uganda
 Parliament of Uganda
 Kabale District

References

External links
 Full Ministerial Cabinet List, June 2006
 Full Ministerial Cabinet List, February 2009
Full Ministerial Cabinet List, May 2011
  Hope Mwesigye Faces Storm Over Museveni Petition

1956 births
Living people
People from Kabale District
National Resistance Movement politicians
20th-century Ugandan lawyers
Ugandan women lawyers
Women government ministers of Uganda
Women members of the Parliament of Uganda
People educated at Trinity College Nabbingo
Government ministers of Uganda
Members of the Parliament of Uganda